The Lady, the Devil and the Model (German: Die Dame, der Teufel und die Probiermamsell) is a 1918 German silent drama film directed by Rudolf Biebrach and starring Henny Porten, Alfred Abel and Eugen Rex.

It was shot at the Tempelhof Studios in Berlin. The film's sets were designed by the art director Kurt Richter.

Cast
 Henny Porten as Die Probiermamsell - Mannequin 
 Alfred Abel as Der Baron - Kavalier 
 Ida Perry as Die Dame - Millionärin 
 Eugen Rex as Fritz 
 Rudolf Biebrach

References

Bibliography
 Jung, Uli & Schatzberg, Walter. Beyond Caligari: The Films of Robert Wiene. Berghahn Books, 1999.

External links

1918 films
Films of the Weimar Republic
German silent feature films
Films directed by Rudolf Biebrach
German drama films
1918 drama films
UFA GmbH films
Films shot at Tempelhof Studios
German black-and-white films
Silent drama films
1910s German films
1910s German-language films